Mory Sinkoun Kaba (1933 – 2015), known as Kaba Mory or MS, was a Guinean businessman and philanthropist. Close to  president Sékou Touré, he realised numerous state projects on his behalf.

Under colonial rule, he became the first Guinean administrator, and district commander. After Guinean independence, he became the first Secretary-General of the Republic of Guinea, and then Home Secretary.

Exile
After the 1984 military coup d'état, Kaba was awarded political refugee status in France, and moved with his family to the 16th arrondissement of Paris. While in France, he had cordial relations with Presidents François Mitterrand et Jacques Chirac.

Starting in the 1990s, while in exile, he had an important role under the opposition politician Alpha Condé. When his death in Chad was announced, Condé, by then president of Guinea, went with several members of the government to his home in Conakry, to offer their condolences to his wife, Kaba Rokhaya Diakité.

Sport
Kaba remained as honorary president of Hafia FC, which he turned into a famous club in Guinea and throughout Africa. As a successful businessman, he put his fortune – and his private jet – at the club's service. He became vice-president of the Guinean Football Federation and a member of the Olympic Committee of Guinea.

Bibliography 
Kaba is extensively quoted by Ambassador André Lewin in his biography of Sékou Touré.

Family life
Mory had 10 children: Fatoumata Kaba, UNHCR spokesperson Mamady Sinkoun Kaba Presidential Director of state Protocol and Ibrahim Sinkoun Kaba.

References

1993 births
2015 deaths
Guinean politicians
Guinean emigrants to France